Tharad is one of the 182 Legislative Assembly constituencies of Gujarat state in India. It is part of Banaskantha district and comes under Banaskantha Lok Sabha constituency for national elections. It came into existence after 2008 delimitation and was numbered as 8-Tharad.

List of segments
This assembly seat represents the following segments,

 Tharad Taluka
 Lakahni Taluka part

Members of Legislative Assembly

Election results

2022

2019 Bypoll

2017

2012

See also
 List of constituencies of the Gujarat Legislative Assembly
 Banaskantha district

References

External links
 

Assembly constituencies of Gujarat
Politics of Banaskantha district